Adrien Maurice de Noailles, 3rd Duke of Noailles (29 September 167824 June 1766) was a French nobleman and soldier.

Biography 
Son of Anne Jules de Noailles, he inherited the title duc de Noailles on his father's death in 1708.

He fought in the War of the Spanish Succession (1710–1713) during which the forces under his command on 24–26 July 1710 drove back a British attack on Sète. He was president of the Finance Council from 1715 to 1718. He distinguished himself in the War of the Polish Succession (1733–1738) and was made a marshal of France in 1734, becoming dean of the marshals in 1748. He served in the War of the Austrian Succession and was appointed to command the French forces in March 1743. He was defeated at the Battle of Dettingen in June 1743, but successfully drove the Austrians out of Alsace-Lorraine the following year, although he missed an opportunity to seriously damage the Austrian army as it was crossing the Rhine.

The duc de Noailles was Foreign Minister from April to November 1744, and regarded Great Britain as a greater enemy of France than Austria. He later acted in a diplomatic capacity and had substantial influence over the course of foreign policy.

Married 
In 1698, as comte d'Ayen, he married Françoise Charlotte Amable d'Aubigné, niece and beneficiary of the marquise de Maintenon, and by her had six children, 4 daughters and 2 sons. His two sons Louis, 4th duc de Noailles, and Philippe, duc de Mouchy, also went on to become marshals of France.

The duc de Noailles was made a knight of the Order of the Golden Fleece in 1702, a Grandee of Spain in 1711, and a Knight of the Order of Saint-Esprit in 1724.

Issue 
Françoise Adélaide de Noailles (1 September 1704January 1776), married Charles de Lorraine in 1717, son of Louis de Lorraine and had no issue; divorced in 1721;
Amable-Gabrielle de Villars (18 February 1706September 1742), lady in waiting to the queen; married Honoré Armand de Villars and had one daughter, Amable Angélique de Villars; Amable Angélique may have been the daughter of le chevalier d'Orléans, whose mistress was Amable Gabrielle;
Marie Louise de Noailles (8 September 171022 May 1782), married in 1737 to Jacques Nompar de Caumont, Duke of La Force and divorced in 1742; had no issue;
Louis de Noailles, duc d'Ayen, duc de Noailles (21 April 171322 August 1793), married Catherine Françoise Charlotte de Cossé-Brissac and had issue;
Philippe de Noailles, comte de Noailles, duc de Mouchy (27 December 171527 June 1794), married the famous Madame Étiquette and had issue; wife was a Lady-in-waiting to Marie Antoinette; Louis and his wife were executed in the Revolution;
Marie Anne Françoise de Noailles (12 January 171929 June 1793), married in 1744 Ludwig Engelbert de La Marck (1701–1773), Count of Schleiden.

References

1678 births
1766 deaths
17th-century French people
18th-century French people
Counts of Ayen
Adrien-Maurice
18th-century French diplomats
French military personnel of the War of the Spanish Succession
French military personnel of the War of the Polish Succession
French military personnel of the War of the Austrian Succession
French Ministers of Finance
Grandees of Spain
Adrien-Maurice
Knights of the Golden Fleece of Spain
Marshals of France
People of the Regency of Philippe d'Orléans
People of the Ancien Régime
French Foreign Ministers
18th-century peers of France